Martin Bakole Ilunga (born 1 June 1993) is a Congolese professional boxer. He is the younger brother of former cruiserweight world champion of boxing, Ilunga Makabu.

Professional career
Bakole made his professional debut on 25 March 2014, scoring a second-round technical knockout (TKO) victory over Cecil Smith at the Emperors Palace in Kempton Park, Gauteng, South Africa.

After compiling a record of 9–0 (6 KO), he faced undefeated Ali Baghouz (10–0–1) on 11 November 2017 at the Royal Highland Centre in Edinburgh, with the vacant IBO Continental heavyweight title on the line. Bakole captured the vacant title via first-round knockout (KO). He successfully defended the title in his next fight with a first-round TKO against DL Jones (8–1–1) on 23 June 2018 at The SSE Hydro in Glasgow.

He next fought former Olympian and cruiserweight world title challenger Michael Hunter (14–1) for the vacant IBO Inter-Continental heavyweight title on 13 October 2018 at the York Hall, London. Bakole lost the fight via tenth-round TKO. The first few rounds were evenly contested with Bakole walking his American opponent down while Hunter remained on the back foot, utilising movement and picking his moments to throw combinations. From round four and onwards, Hunter began to make an impression with his ring movement and speedy combinations. Towards the end of the seventh, Bakole landed a powerful right hand that stunned Hunter, causing the former cruiserweight to hold in the clinch. Hunter, now looking fatigued and suffering a cut to the right eye, had his mouth piece knocked out in the eighth by a clean right hand. After injuring his right shoulder in the eighth, Bakole was reluctant to throw the right hand in the ninth, instead choosing to work behind the jab. The end came in the tenth and final round; with Hunter landing powerful shots with more frequency, a left hook sent Bakole stumbling – not for the first time during the round – towards the corner. After a barrage of unanswered punches, referee Phil Edwards waved off the fight with 41 seconds of the round remaining, handing Bakole the first defeat of his professional career.

Following his loss to Hunter, Bakole fought former heavyweight world title challenger Mariusz Wach (33–4) on 6 April 2019 at the Spodek Arena in Katowice, Poland, with the vacant Republic of Poland International heavyweight title up for grabs. Bakole won the fight via eighth-round TKO in a scheduled ten-round bout. The first-round saw Wach boxing in a defensive manner, staying at range behind the jab and looking to counter-punch. The next few rounds saw Bakole take the lead. Throwing heavy combination punches to the head of his Polish opponent. Towards the end of the fifth, Bakole landed several punches to his opponent's head, leaving Wach on unsteady legs as he walked back to his corner. Wach attempted to rally back in the sixth-round, having success as Bakole's pace slowed. Bakole came back in the seventh to repeat his performance of previous rounds, putting together combinations and landing punches to the head of Wach. The end came in the eighth when referee Robert Gortat waved off the fight after Wach was on the receiving end of a flurry of twelve unanswered punches.

Following a first-round TKO win over Ytalo Perea (11–4–2) in August, Bakole was scheduled to face Gabriel Enguema on 19 October 2019 at the Utilita Arena, Newcastle. Days before the fight, Enguema withdrew from the bout due to an injury. Former world title challenger Kevin Johnson (34–15–1) stepped in at short notice. In what was a one-sided affair, Bakole won by fifth-round TKO in a scheduled eight-round bout after referee Ron Kearney waved off the fight following Johnson being on the receiving end of several unanswered punches, handing the durable veteran boxer the third stoppage defeat of his career.

Professional boxing record

References

Living people
1993 births
Democratic Republic of the Congo male boxers
Heavyweight boxers
People from Kananga
21st-century Democratic Republic of the Congo people